Friedrich Wilhelm, Prince of Hohenzollern (3 February 1924 – 16 September 2010) was the head of the Princely House of Hohenzollern for over 45 years.

Biography
Friedrich Wilhelm was born in Schloss Umkirch. He was the eldest son of Friedrich, Prince of Hohenzollern (1891–1965) and his wife, Princess Margarete Karola of Saxony (1900–1962), the daughter of the last King of Saxony Frederick Augustus III. He became the head of the House of Hohenzollern on 6 February 1965 following the death of his father Prince Friedrich, and remained so until his death on 16 September 2010. 

According to the Romanian succession laws of the kingdom's last democratic Constitution of 1923, Friedrich Wilhelm's descendants have had a claim to the throne of Romania since 2017, when former King Michael passed away.

Marriage and issue
Friedrich Wilhelm married Princess Margarita of Leiningen (1932–1996) on 3 February 1951. She was a child of Karl, 6th Prince of Leiningen, and his wife, Grand Duchess Maria Kirillovna of Russia.

They had three children:

 Karl Friedrich, Prince of Hohenzollern (born 1952), who succeeded Friedrich Wilhelm as head of the House of Hohenzollern;
 Prince Albrecht of Hohenzollern (born 1954), married Nathalie Rocabado de Viets and had two children;
 Prince Ferdinand of Hohenzollern (born 1960), married Countess Ilona Kálnoky de Köröspatak and had three children.

Courtesy titles and styles
3 February 1924 – 22 October 1927: His Serene Highness Prince Friedrich Wilhelm of Hohenzollern
22 October 1927 – 6 February 1965: His Highness The Hereditary Prince of Hohenzollern
6 February 1965 – 16 September 2010: His Highness The Prince of Hohenzollern

Honours 
 Grand Master of the Princely House Order of Hohenzollern
  Knight of the Seraphim (1961)
  Knight Grand Cross of Justice of the Sacred Military Constantinian Order of Saint George.
 Knight of Saint Hubert. 
  Officer's Cross (Merit Cross 1st Class) of the Order of Merit of the Federal Republic of Germany.
  Knight of the Black Eagle. 
  Knight of the Golden Fleece. 
 Bailiff Grand Cross Honour and Devotion of the Sovereign Military Order of Malta
 Grand Cross of the Order of Carol I

Ancestry

References

Sources
Obituary of His Highness Prince Friedrich Wilhelm, The Daily Telegraph, 13 October 2010

External links
Hohenzollern website

1924 births
2010 deaths
Princes of Hohenzollern
German landowners
People from Breisgau-Hochschwarzwald
Knights of the Golden Fleece
Officers Crosses of the Order of Merit of the Federal Republic of Germany
Recipients of the Order of Merit of Baden-Württemberg